Evening Azoyan (Yerekoyan Azoyan) is a late night talk show hosted by Armenian entertainers Hovhannes Azoyan and Mher Khachatryan.  The series premiered on Armenia TV on March 26, 2018. The series currently airs on Saturdays at 9 pm. It is generally structured around humorous monologues about the day's news, guest interviews, comedy sketches and music performances. Special guests play humorous games and participate in competitions that vary by their courage. Popular guests of the show include Iveta Mukuchyan, Arame, Levon Harutyunyan, Grisha Aghakhanyan, Ashot Ghazaryan, Vache Tovmasyan, Anna Grigoryan.

References

Armenian-language television shows
Armenia TV original programming
Armenian television game shows
Armenian comedy television series
2010s Armenian television series
2018 Armenian television series debuts
2010s game shows